Asnières-sur-Vègre (literally "Asnières on Vègre") is a commune in the Sarthe department in the region of Pays de la Loire in north-western France.

See also
Communes of the Sarthe department

References

External links

Jardin Mosaique

Communes of Sarthe